Chris DeGeare (born February 17, 1987) is a former American football offensive guard. He was drafted 161st overall pick by the Minnesota Vikings in the fifth round of the 2010 NFL Draft.

College career
He played collegiate football for the Wake Forest Demon Deacons. He played high school football for Robert B. Glenn High School in Kernersville, NC, where he graduated in 2005.

Professional career

Minnesota Vikings
On August 31, 2012 as the Vikings reduced their roster down to league maximum of 53 players, he was released.

Tennessee Titans
On September 5, 2012, he was added to the Tennessee Titans practice squad.

New York Giants
On January 8, 2013, DeGeare signed a reserve/future contract with the New York Giants. On August 20, 2013, he was waived/injured by the Giants. On August 21, 2013, he cleared waivers and was placed on the Giants' injured reserve list.

Dallas Cowboys
On January 8, 2014, DeGeare was signed to a reserve/future contract by the Dallas Cowboys.

Personal life
In 2012, DeGeare married Moraya Seeger Jackson, a marriage and family therapist. She is a granddaughter of folk singer and activist, Pete Seeger. Their child was born in 2015.

References

American football offensive guards
American football offensive tackles
Wake Forest Demon Deacons football players
Minnesota Vikings players
Tennessee Titans players
1987 births
Living people
Players of American football from Arizona
Sportspeople from Chandler, Arizona